William Devereux Palmer is an electrical engineer at the U.S. Army Research Office in Durham, North Carolina. He was named a Fellow of the Institute of Electrical and Electronics Engineers (IEEE) in 2012 for his contributions to microwave and millimeter wave systems and sources.

References 

Fellow Members of the IEEE
Living people
Year of birth missing (living people)
Place of birth missing (living people)
American electrical engineers